Rodney Reader (born 24 June 1961) is a Barbadian sailor. He competed in the Laser event at the 1996 Summer Olympics.

References

External links
 

1961 births
Living people
Barbadian male sailors (sport)
Olympic sailors of Barbados
Sailors at the 1996 Summer Olympics – Laser
Place of birth missing (living people)